Houston Baptist Huskies basketball may refer to either of the basketball teams that represent Houston Baptist University:
Houston Baptist Huskies men's basketball
Houston Baptist Huskies women's basketball